Debar (Albanian: Dibër/Dibra or Dibra e Madhe) is a city in the western part of North Macedonia, near the border with Albania, off the road from Struga to Gostivar. It is the seat of Debar Municipality. Debar has an ethnic Albanian majority of 74% and is North Macedonia's only city in which ethnic Macedonians do not rank first or second demographically. The official languages are Macedonian and Albanian.

Name
The name of the city in Macedonian is Debar (Дебар). In Albanian; Dibër/Dibra or Dibra e Madhe (meaning "Great Dibra", in contrast to the other Dibër in Albania). In Serbian Debar, in Bulgarian Debǎr, in Turkish Debre or Debre-i Bala, in Greek, Dívrē or Dívra, in Ancient Greek Dèvoros, Δήβορος and in Roman times as Deborus.

Geography
Debar is surrounded by the Dešat, Stogovo, Jablanica and Bistra mountains.

It is located 625 meters above sea level, next to Lake Debar, the Black Drin River and its smaller break-off river, Radika.

Population
According to the last census data from 2002, the city of Debar has a population of 14,561, made up of
10,768 (74.0%) Albanians,
 1,415 (9.7%) Turks,
 1,079 (7.2%) Roma,
 1,054 (7.2%) Macedonians, and
245 (1.7%) others.

History

The earliest recording of Debar is under the name of ‘Deborus’ on a map drawn by the astronomer and cartographer Ptolemy in the 2nd century.

The Byzantine emperor Basil II knew of its existence, historian Anna Komnena recorded the name as Devré in the Alexiad, and Felix Petancic referred to it as Dibri in 1502.

After Samuel of Bulgaria was defeated in 1014 by Byzantine emperor Basil II, Debar was administered under the Bishopric of Bitola.

During the period between 12th, 13th and early 14th century, Debar was ruled by the Albanian noble Gropa family. In the latter half of the 14th century until the first half of the 15th century it was ruled by the Principality of Kastrioti, an Albanian medieval principality ruled by the Kastrioti noble family and later from 1443 by the Albanian state, League of Lezhë. Debar fell under the rule of the Ottoman Empire when local ruler Gjon Kastrioti died shortly after his four children were taken hostage.

It was conquered by the Ottomans in 1395 and subsequently became the seat of the Sanjak of Dibra.

In 1440 Skanderbeg was appointed as its sanjakbey.

Gjergj Kastrioti, survived to take back his father's land and unite all of Albania in 1444. A larger than life size statue of Skanderbeg adorns Dibër's centre, showing the fondness that the locals have for his cause. During the Ottoman-Albanian wars between 1443-1479 the Dibër region was the borderline between the Ottomans and the League of Lezhë led by Skanderbeg and became an area of continuous conflict. There were two major battles near Debar, on June 29, 1444 The Battle of Torvioll and on September 27, 1446 The Battle of Otonetë both ending with the defeat of the Ottoman armies and Albanian victories.

Debar was overrun once again by the Turks, and became known as Debre. The city constantly rebelled against Turkish rule, however, not least because of the wealth of the many Turkish bey and aga who lived there off local taxes and the fat of the land. Turkish rule also brought trade to Debar and the city centre grew and became known for its crafts industry. Much of the architect from that period still survives.

In the early 19th century, when Debar rebelled against the Turkish Sultan, the French traveller, publicist, and scientist Ami Boue observed that Debar had 64 shops and 4,200 residents. It was first a sanjak centre in Scutari Vilayet before 1877, and afterwards in Manastir Vilayet between 1877-1912 as Debre or Debre-i Bala ("Upper Debre" in Ottoman Turkish, as contrasted with Debre-i Zir, which was Peshkopi's Turkish name).

In the late Ottoman period, Debre (Debar) was a town with 20,000 inhabitants, 420 shops, 9 mosques, 10 madrasas, 5 tekkes, 11 government run primary schools, 1 secondary school, 3 Christian primary schools and 1 church. An Ottoman army division was also stationed within the town.

Debar was significantly involved in the national Albanian movement and on November 1, 1878 the Albanian leaders of the city participated in founding the League of Prizren.

In 1907 the Congress of Dibra was held in the town, which made Albanian an official language within the Ottoman Empire. The congress allowed that Albanian be taught in schools legally for the first time within the Empire.

Following the capture of the town of Debar by Serbia, many of its Albanian inhabitants fled to Turkey, the rest went to Tirana. Of those that ended up in Istanbul, some of their number migrated to Albania, mainly to Tirana where the Dibran community formed an important segment of the capital city's population from 1920 onward and for some years thereafter.

During the Balkan wars of 1912–13 Debar was taken back by the Albanians, but was then handed over to the Kingdom of Serbs, Croats and Slovenes as a reward for helping the Allies during World War I. Thereafter many Serbs and Montenegrins were encouraged to settle in Debar, a common tactic to ensure that newly acquired land became more integrated with the motherland.

It was occupied by Kingdom of Bulgaria between 1915 and 1918.

From 1929 to 1941, Debar was part of the Vardar Banovina of the Kingdom of Yugoslavia.

Debar was annexed, along with most of Western North Macedonia, into the Italian-controlled Kingdom of Albania on 17 April 1941, following the Axis invasion of Yugoslavia during the Second World War. Albania was officially a protectorate of Italy and therefore public administration duties were passed to Albanian authorities. Albanian language schools, radio stations and newspapers were established in Debar. When Italy capitulated in September 1943, Debar passed into German hands. In 1944, after a two-month struggle for the city between the communist Albanian National Liberation Front and German forces holding the city, including the SS Skanderbeg division, the communists led by Haxhi Lleshi finally secured Debar on August 30, 1944.

After the cessation of hostilities with the end of WW2 and the establishment of communism in both Albania and Yugoslavia, Debar passed back into Yugoslav hands.

Culture 

Some of the best craftsman, woodcarving masters and builders came from the Debar region and were recognized for their skills in creating detailed and impressive woodcarvings, painting beautiful icons and building unique architecture. In fact, Debar was one of the then famous three woodcarving schools in the region, the other two being Samokov and Bansko. Their work can be seen in many churches and cultural buildings throughout the Balkan Peninsula. The Mijak School of woodcarving became noted for its artistic excellence, and an amazing example that can be seen today by tourists is the iconostasis in the nearby Monastery of Saint Jovan Bigorski, near the town of Debar. The monastery was rebuilt in the 19th century and is situated on the slopes of Mount Bistra, above the banks of the River Radika. The monastery was built on the remains of an older church dating from 1021.

Another important religious monument is the monastery of Saint Gjorgi in the village of Rajcica in the immediate vicinity of Debar. The monastery was recently built.

Grigor Parlichev was given the title Second Homer in 1860 in Athens for his poem The Serdar. Based on a folk poem, it deals with the exploits and heroic death of Kuzman Kapidan, a famous hero and protector of Christian people in the Debar region in their struggle with bandits.

Some of the oldest and richest Albanian epics still exist in the Debar regions and are part of the Albanian mythological heritage.

Debar is also known for its pizza consumption. As of 2018, Debar had one pizzeria for every 3,000 residents, and emigrants from the town had opened approximately 50 pizza restaurants in the United States.

Sports
Local football club Korabi plays in the Macedonian Second League (West Division).

International relations

Partner towns
Partner towns of Debar:

 Vidin, Bulgaria

Notable people from Debar 
 Gjon Kastrioti, father of Skanderbeg
 Nexhat Agolli, politician and deputy president of ASNOM
 Eqrem Basha, writer
 Abdurraman Dibra, politician, minister in Ahmet Zogu's rule
 Fiqri Dine, former prime minister of Albania
 Akif Erdemgil, military officer in the Ottoman and Turkish armies
 Moisi Golemi, general in Skenderbeg's army
 John of Debar, Orthodox clergyman
 Sherif Lengu, a founding father of modern Albania
 Haki Stërmilli, writer
 Myfti Vehbi Dibra Agolli, modern Albania founding father
Selim Rusi, Albanian Nationalist.

References

General references
 The History of Byzantine State by G. Ostrogorsky
 The Serdar by G. Prlicev

External links

Cities in North Macedonia
Debar Municipality